Every Now and Then may refer to:
 "Every Now and Then"' a 1929 song written by Don McNamee; King Zany; P M Griffith
 "Every Now and Then", a 1935 popular song written by Al Sherman, Al Lewis and Abner Silver
 "Every Now and Then", a song by Mac Davis from 1976
 "Every Now and Then", a song by Garth Brooks from The Chase 
 "Every Now and Then", a song by Earth, Wind and Fire from Touch the World
 "Every Now and Then", a song by Girls Aloud from the greatest hits album Ten
 "Every Now and Then", a song by the Noisettes from Wild Young Hearts
 Every Now and Then: Songs of Townes Van Zandt & Blaze Foley, an album by Blaze Foley, or the title song
 "Every Now and Then", a song by Santana from Dance of the Rainbow Serpent

See also 
Now and Then (disambiguation)
Then and Now (disambiguation)